Zvi Yehuda (born Zvi Zaltzman in 1887, died 3 October 1965) was a Zionist activist and later a politician.

Biography
Born in Uman in the Russian Empire (today in Ukraine), Yehuda organised two Zionist youth groups in Uman, Degel Zion and Tzeiri Zion. In 1906, he made aliyah to Ottoman-controlled Palestine, and was amongst the founders of Kvutzat Kinneret in 1908. In 1912, he helped establish Degania, the first kibbutz. During World War I he served as a member of the Galilee Workers Committee.

In 1920, Yehuda travelled to Europe to help immigrants of the Third Aliyah. The following year he helped found Nahalal, the first moshav ovdim, and was a director of the Moshav fund and a member of the Moshavim Movement's secretariat, as well as the Farmers Federation and Histadrut trade union. He helped establish Hapoel Hatzair movement, and was a member of its central committee. He also helped establish Hapoel Hatzair and Tzeiri Zion in the United States.

In 1949, he was elected to the first Knesset on the Mapai list. However, he lost his seat in the 1951 elections. He died in 1965.

His wife was Nettie Antonow, daughter of Ben-Zion Antonow and Fanny Sharegordsky Antonow, founders of Ramat Gan, Israel.

External links

1887 births
1965 deaths
People from Uman
Jews from the Russian Empire
Mapai politicians
Zionist activists
Emigrants from the Russian Empire to the Ottoman Empire
Jews in Ottoman Palestine
Members of the 1st Knesset (1949–1951)